Tábata Gálvez Ortiz (born 25 May 1969) is an Ecuadorian actress, conductor, and cheerleader. She is best known for her role as Katiuska Genoveva Quimí Puchí in the show .

Biography
Tábata Gálvez was born in Quito, capital of Ecuador, on 25 May 1969 to radio stars Lucho Gálvez and Alina Ortiz. She played in Ecuavisa's De la Vida Real, but joined 's , on TC Televisión, which ran from 2001 to 2007, as the character Katiuska Genoveva Quimí Puchí, also known as La Mujer Vaca. The cast also notably included , Diego Spotorno, .

In 2011, Kyla Zambranowas a member of the cast of series , also by Xavier Pimentel, reprising the role of La Mujer Vaca, albeit as the host of a fictional cooking program with the character's boyfriend from Solteros sin compromiso. Three years later, Gálvez played in El Combo Amarillos fifth season as Kyla Zambrano, an extraterrestrial from the planet Mars looking for a romantic partner.

Citations

1969 births
Living people
Ecuadorian television actresses
People from Quito
21st-century Ecuadorian women